Invasion 1897 is a Nigerian movie that re-enacted the historical events that culminated in the February, 1897 invasion, destruction and looting of the ancient West African kingdom of Benin; and the deposition and exile of its once powerful king. The movie which was produced and directed by Lancelot Oduwa Imasuen was released in 2014 and features several Nollywood actors including Segun Arinze, Paul Obazele and Charles Inojie. The plot of the story picks off from the narration of a young prince of Benin, who was arrested and brought to trial for stealing historical artifacts from a British museum and his journey into history to defend himself.

At BON Awards, Invasion 1897 was nominated for best cinematography, best actor, best special effects, best editing and it won for Best film, best sound design and best Director.

References

External links
 

2014 films
Nigerian drama films
Nigerian films based on actual events